Unbreakable Kimmy Schmidt: Kimmy vs the Reverend is a 2020 interactive film sequel to the sitcom Unbreakable Kimmy Schmidt created by Tina Fey and Robert Carlock, directed by Claire Scanlon. It stars Ellie Kemper, Jane Krakowski, Tituss Burgess and Carol Kane. The special was nominated for two Emmy Awards: Outstanding Television Movie and Outstanding Supporting Actor in a Limited Series or Movie for Burgess.

The movie employs interactive technology to allow the audience to choose their own adventure and various choices they make early on also affect how the story ends with multiple possible endings.

Plot 
Due to its interactive nature, the film offers various possible "endings" that lead to the film's ending earlier depending on choices the viewer makes. However, all early endings result in the audience being re-routed to a choice that extends the story with the final shape of the film resembling the following plot points:

Kimmy Schmidt, now a hugely successful children's author, plans her wedding to Prince Frederick, who is thirteenth in line to the throne of England. Joining her are her friends Titus Andromedon, Lillian Kaushtupper, and Jacqueline White. When looking in her backpack, Kimmy finds a Choose Your Own Adventure-style book she has never seen in a hidden pocket. After reading the book and realizing it was not one of hers, she decides to travel to the prison in Durnsville, Indiana to question Richard Wayne Gary Wayne, the man who kept her captive for fifteen years, with Titus coming with her as support.

After realizing that Frederick never had a girlfriend before Kimmy, Lillian suggests he spend the night before his wedding coming to terms with his past and realizing how amazing Kimmy is. Left alone on the set of Titus' new action film, Jacqueline attempts to keep the secret that Titus is gone from the production staff.

In Durnsville, Richard Wayne Gary Wayne reveals to Kimmy that he had a second underground bunker. Using information Richard had accidentally disclosed and the name of the library the book was taken from, Kimmy and Titus go looking for the second bunker, their journey made even more imperative when they learn Richard has escaped from prison and is headed to the bunker himself.

Kimmy and Titus are eventually separated when Kimmy finds Richard and chases him. She manages to catch up to him when he trips on a branch and severely injures his ankle. When he claims that he cannot remember where the underground bunker is located, Kimmy decides to fashion him a splint and help him return home, only to discover the door to the hidden bunker. She manages to free the women inside.

Later on, Kimmy and Frederick marry in a ceremony officiated by Jacqueline's former stepdaughter Xanthippe.

Cast 

 Ellie Kemper as Kimmy Schmidt
 Jane Krakowski as Jacqueline White
 Tituss Burgess as Titus Andromedon
 Carol Kane as Lillian Kaushtupper/Fiona
 Daniel Radcliffe as Prince Frederick
 Jon Hamm as Richard Wayne Gary Wayne
 Lauren Adams as Gretchen Chalker
Sara Chase as Cyndee Pokorny
Sol Miranda as Donna Maria Nuñez
Amy Sedaris as Mimi Kanassis
Dylan Gelula as Xanthippe Voorhees
Jack McBrayer as Sandy Parcell
Heidi Gardner as Jenny
Zak Orth as Cody Santimonio
Tanner Flood as Buckley Voorhees
Mike Britt as Walter Bankston
Fred Armisen as Robert "Bobby" Durst
Mike Carlsen as Mikey Politano
Stephanie D'Abruzzo as Jan
Bill Barretta as Mr. Frumpus
Niceto Darcey Festin as George Georgiulio
Josh Groban as himself
Bowen Yang as Kim Jong-un

Production 

The special was written using Netflix's Branch Manager technology to "push comedy to places it's never been before."

The trailer for the special was released on April 15, 2020.

Release and reception 

The film was released on Netflix on May 12, 2020. The site's critical consensus reads: "Kimmy and company return as resilient as ever in a fun and fast paced special that makes excellent use of its interactive capabilities to produce maximum fabulosity."

Awards and nominations

References

External links 

2020 films
Unbreakable Kimmy Schmidt
Television episodes about multiple time paths
Interactive films
2020s interactive fiction
English-language Netflix original films
American television specials
2020 television films
Films directed by Claire Scanlon
Films with screenplays by Tina Fey
2020 comedy films
American comedy films
Films based on television series
2020s English-language films
2020s American films
English-language comedy films